Discogobio dienbieni is a fish species in the genus Discogobio endemic to Vietnam. The fish lives in freshwater.

Cypriniformes
Discogobio dienbieni is in the Cypriniformes (Carp) family.

See also
Discogobio bismargaritus
Discogobio tetrabarbatus
Discogobio microstoma
Discogobio elongatus
Discogobio yunnanensis
Discogobio laticeps
Discogobio macrophysallidos
Discogobio brachyphysallidos

References

External links 

Cyprinid fish of Asia
Fish described in 2001
Discogobio